Conservative (K), formerly The Christians Party (PDK) is a conservative Christian political party in Norway founded in 2011. The party leader is Erik Selle.

History
Founded as The Christians, the party was formed when the Christian Democratic Party abolished its requirement that its representatives profess the Christian faith. The party saw this as a major step in the "de-Christianization" of the party, along with a perceived wider de-Christianization of Norway during the years of the Red–Green government.

The party participated in its first election for the 2011 local elections limited to the municipal council in Bømlo. They won 6.5% of the votes there, earning them two seats. Bømlo was selected to test support for the new party, with defected local Christian Democratic politicians heading their list. Some saw the party's founding meeting on Moster in Bømlo as symbolic, as it was the original starting point of the Christianization of Norway by King Olaf Tryggvason a thousand years ago.

For the 2013 parliamentary election the party gained additional support from philosopher Nina Karin Monsen, veteran Christian Democratic politician Anita Apelthun Sæle, and Visjon Norge televangelist Jan Hanvold. It received 0.6% of the national vote (17,731 votes), winning no seats but becoming second largest of the extra-parliamentary parties.

Before the 2015 local elections the Christians drew numerous local politicians from the Christian Democrats as well as the Progress Party, and the party had a large number of new local chapters established. The party managed to secure lists for the elections in 70 municipalities, as well as all the counties of Norway. Among the speakers at the party's national congress in May was the Israeli Greek Orthodox priest Gabriel Naddaf. The party won three municipal representatives in the election, one each in Bømlo, Vennesla and Karmøy.

In the 2019 Norwegian local elections, the party improved on their previous results, with a total of 10 423 votes (0,4% total), giving them six municipal council members and their first even county council member in the Agder county elections.

The party congress decided on the 5 September 2022, to change the party`s name to Konservativt (Conservative).

Ideology
The party considers its ideology to be built on Christian and "Judeo-Christian" values. It profiles itself as anti-abortion, promotes the traditional family and opposition to same-sex marriage, maintains strong support for Israel, and supports economic liberalism. The party claims to follow the line of former Christian Democrat leader Kåre Kristiansen. Unlike the Christian Democrats the party supports cooperation with the Progress Party, and has stated that it aims for participation in a coalition government together with the Progress and Conservative Party.

Parliamentary elections

References

External links

Christian democratic parties in Norway
Conservative parties in Norway
Political parties established in 2011
2011 establishments in Norway
Protestant political parties
Anti-abortion organisations in Norway
Religious organisations based in Norway